Herbert Snook (23 December 1867 – 13 October 1947) was an English footballer who played in The Football League for Notts County.

Not long after he turned 21 he was signed by Notts County F.C. but played no first-team matches in the 1887–1888 season.

Herbert died on 13 October 1947 in Lenton, a suburb of the City of Nottingham at the age of 79.

References

1867 births
1947 deaths
English footballers
Notts County F.C. players
English Football League players
People from Lenton, Nottingham
Footballers from Nottinghamshire
Association football fullbacks